Joseph Amiel (born June 3, 1937, New York City) is an American attorney, novelist and screenwriter. He attended the Fieldston School in New York City and graduated from Amherst College in 1959; he received an LL.B. degree from Yale Law School in 1962.

The Archives and Special Collections at Amherst College holds his papers.

Works

Screenplays
 Daughters of Darkness (1971)
 The Hunted (1974)

Novels

External links
 Joseph Amiel (AC 1959) Papers from the Amherst College Archives & Special Collections

References

1937 births
American lawyers
20th-century American novelists
20th-century American male writers
Ethical Culture Fieldston School alumni
Yale Law School alumni
Living people
American male novelists
Novelists from New York (state)
American screenwriters

Amherst College alumni